The Eastern Carolina League was a minor league baseball affiliation which operated in the Eastern part of North Carolina. The league had two distinct periods of operation: 1908 to 1910 and a revival of the league in 1928 and 1929. It was classified as a Class D level league.

The most famous person to play in the league was Jim Thorpe, considered by some the greatest athlete of the twentieth century. It was his involvement with the Eastern Carolina League that cost him his amateur status and his 1912 Summer Olympics metals.

Eastern Carolina League champions 

1908 – Wilson Tobacconists †
1909 –Wilson Tobacconists
1910 – Fayetteville Highlanders
1928 – Goldsboro Manufacturers 
1929 – Rocky Mount Buccaneers

† In late August 1908, Eastern North Carolina was hit by what is now known as Tropical Storm #5. The playoffs were abandoned with Wilmington leading Wilson 2 games to 1.

Cities represented 
Fayetteville, NC: Fayetteville Highlanders 1909–1910
Goldsboro, NC: Goldsboro Giants 1908–1910; Goldsboro Manufacturers 1928; Goldsboro Goldbugs 1929 
Greenville, NC: Greenville Tobacconists 1928–1929
Kinston, NC: Kinston 1908; Kinston Eagles 1928–1929 
New Bern, NC: New Bern 1908
Raleigh, NC: Raleigh Red Birds 1908–1910 
Rocky Mount, NC: Rocky Mount Railroaders 1909–1910; Rocky Mount Buccaneers 1928–1929 
Wilmington, NC: Wilmington Sailors 1908–1910; Wilmington Pirates 1928–1929 
Wilson, NC: Wilson Tobacconists 1908–1910

Standings & statistics

1908 to 1910
1908 schedule 
 New Bern and Kinston withdrew July 15 Playoffs: Abandoned August 27 due to bad weather. Wilmington was leading Wilson 2 games to 1. 
 
1909 schedule
Playoffs: Wilson awarded Championship after ineligible player violations were enacted.  
 
1910 schedule
Playoffs: Fayetteville 4 games, Rocky Mount 1.

1928 to 1929
Playoffs: Goldsboro 4 games, Wilmington 2. 

Playoffs: Rocky Mount 4 games, Wilmington 2.

External links
Page about Thorpe

References

Defunct minor baseball leagues in the United States
Baseball leagues in North Carolina
Sports leagues established in 1908
Sports leagues disestablished in 1910
Sports leagues established in 1928
Sports leagues disestablished in 1929